Mother Fist and Her Five Daughters (often shortened to Mother Fist) is the third studio album by the British singer/songwriter Marc Almond. It was released in April 1987 and reached number 41 on the UK Albums Chart. Mother Fist and Her Five Daughters includes the singles "Ruby Red", "Melancholy Rose", and "Mother Fist". The album title is taken from Nocturnal Turnings or How Siamese Twins Have Sex, a short story by the American author Truman Capote. Almond dedicates the album in the liner notes to Capote.

Almond with his assembled band The Willing Sinners, made up of Annie Hogan, Billy McGee, Martin McCarrick, Richard Riley and Steven Humphreys, accompanied by studio musicians recorded the songs for the album at Milo Studios, London and Abbey Road. The artwork was designed by Huw Feather with photography by Ben Thornberry.

Track listing

Personnel
 Marc Almond – vocals, arrangements
 The Willing Sinners
 Annie Hogan – piano, marimba, pump organ
 Billy McGee – double bass, electric bass guitar
 Martin McCarrick – cello, accordion, yang t'chin, keyboards
 Richard Riley – acoustic guitar, electric guitar
 Steven Humphreys – drums, assorted percussion
with:
 Nigel Eaton – hurdy-gurdy
 Peter Thoms – trombone
 Enrico Tomasso – trumpet
 Jane West – backing vocals
 Audrey Riley – backing vocals
Technical
 Mike Hedges – Vocals, Producer, Engineering (Abbey Road)
 Annie Hogan – Arrangements
 Martin McCarrick – Cello Arrangements
 Charles Gray – Engineering (Milo)
 Haydn Bendall – Engineering (Abbey Road)
 Ian Grimble – Engineering (Abbey Road)
 Huw Feather – Design, Layout
 Ben Thornberry – Photography

References

1987 albums
Marc Almond albums
Albums produced by Mike Hedges
Virgin Records albums